The Deep East Texas Council of Government (DETCOG) is a voluntary association of cities, counties and special districts in Deep East Texas.

Based in Angelina County, Texas, in Lufkin, the Deep East Texas Council of Governments is a member of the Texas Association of Regional Councils.

Counties served

Largest cities in the region

References

External links
Deep East Texas Council of Governments - Official site.

Texas Association of Regional Councils